Stenopus is a genus of swimming decapod crustaceans containing eleven species, including Stenopus hispidus, a common aquarium pet. Stenopus contains the following species:

Stenopus chrysexanthus Goy, 1992
Stenopus cyanoscelis Goy, 1984
Stenopus devaneyi Goy & Randall in Goy, 1984
Stenopus earlei Goy & Randall in Goy, 1984
Stenopus goyi Saito, Okuno & Chan, 2009
Stenopus hispidus (Olivier, 1811)
Stenopus pyrsonotus Goy & Devaney, 1980
Stenopus scutellatus Rankin, 1898
Stenopus spinosus Risso, 1826
Stenopus tenuirostris De Man, 1888
Stenopus zanzibaricus Bruce, 1976

References 

Stenopodidea
Taxa named by Pierre André Latreille
Crustacean genera